Elvir Ibišević (born 10 February 1998) is a Bosnian professional footballer who plays as a forward. He has represented Bosnia and Herzegovina national football team at the senior level.

Club career
Born in Bosnia and Herzegovina, Ibišević grew up in the United States. Ibišević was a star soccer player at Johnston High School, and was a member of the Sporting Kansas City academy. He opted to join the Omaha Mavericks a year early in 2016. Ibišević joined the Des Moines Menace in 2016, and was the youngest member of the team.

In July 2018, Elvir officially joined NK Celje in the Slovenian Prva Liga on 3-year deal. He made his official debut for the club in a match against Triglav Kranj on August 18. He scored his first goal for NK Celje on October 27 against Triglav Kranj.

In July 2019, NK Celje announced they would be parting ways with Ibišević, leaving him a free agent. He would join Chemie Leipzig. On December 19, the club announced that they would part ways with Elvir by mutual consent.

International career
Ibišević was born in Bosnia and Herzegovina, but moved to the United States at the age of 2 and was raised in Johnston, Iowa. Previously a youth international for the United States, he was called up to the Bosnia and Herzegovina national football team for a friendly match against the USA on 28 January 2018. He made his debut in the 83rd minute of the 0-0 tie with the United States.

Personal life
Ibišević is the cousin of the Bosnian-Herzegovinian international footballer Vedad Ibišević.

References

External links

 Omaha Mavericks Profile
 

1998 births
Living people
Sportspeople from Tuzla
Bosnia and Herzegovina emigrants to the United States
People from Johnston, Iowa
Sportspeople from Des Moines, Iowa
Soccer players from Iowa
Association football forwards
Bosnia and Herzegovina footballers
Bosnia and Herzegovina international footballers
American soccer players
United States men's youth international soccer players
Omaha Mavericks men's soccer players
Des Moines Menace players
NK Celje players
BSG Chemie Leipzig (1997) players
USL League Two players
Slovenian PrvaLiga players
Regionalliga players
Bosnia and Herzegovina expatriate footballers
Expatriate footballers in Slovenia
Bosnia and Herzegovina expatriate sportspeople in Slovenia
Expatriate footballers in Germany
Bosnia and Herzegovina expatriate sportspeople in Germany